This is a list of heads of state of Mauritania since the country gained independence from France in 1960 to the present day.

A total of nine people have served as head of state of Mauritania (not counting one Acting President). Additionally, one person, Mohamed Ould Abdel Aziz, has served on two non-consecutive occasions.

The current head of state of Mauritania is the President of the Republic Mohamed Ould Ghazouani, since 1 August 2019.

Titles
 1960–1961: Acting Head of State
 1961–1978: President of the Islamic Republic
 1978–1979: Chairman of the Military Committee for National Recovery
 1979: Head of State and Chairman of the Military Committee for National Recovery
 1979–1992: Head of State and Chairman of the Military Committee for National Salvation
 1992–2005: President of the Islamic Republic
 2005–2007: Chairman of the Military Council for Justice and Democracy
 2007–2008: President of the Islamic Republic
 2008–2009: President of the High Council of State
 2009–present: President of the Islamic Republic

Key
Political parties

Other factions

Status

List of officeholders

Timeline

Latest election

See also
 Politics of Mauritania
 List of prime ministers of Mauritania
 List of colonial governors of Mauritania

Notes

References

External links
 World Statesmen – Mauritania

Mauritania
 
Political history of Mauritania
Mauritania politics-related lists
Mauritania history-related lists
1961 establishments in Africa